Baksı Museum is a museum located in Bayburt, Turkey. “Baksı” literally means “healer, helper, protector” in the West Asia. The museum offers contemporary art and traditional handcrafts. The basic aim of the foundation is, as quoted by founder Professor Hüsamettin Koçan, to "disseminate art and culture by bringing together contemporary and traditional art, to collect, document, classify, preserve and promote works of contemporary and traditional art, to use this base in realizing creation, and to hand local and national cultural values down to future generations".

Exhibitions
 Nuri Bilge Ceylan, May–August 2019
 Earth, June–October 2018
 The Thorn On My Foot, May–November 2017
 ON, August 15
 The Sculptured Road To Miro, August 2014
 Distance and Contact, August 2012
 Custom and Art, October 2010

Preparation Stage 
 Shaman's Diary March - April 2004
 Charmed Hands 2, December - January 2003
 Charmed Hands, 2000-2002 (Bilgi University's Art Space Information Workshop 111)

History
It sprouted as a dream of Bayburt-born artist and academy Professor. Dr. Hüsamettin Koçan in 2000. This project is the result of an effort to carry life to Husamettin Koçan's lands. Baksı Culture and Art Foundation was founded in 2005 in order to make this idea come to life. The museum has turned into a truly social project over the years with the contribution of many volunteers, especially artists.

The main building of the museum was completed in 2010 after a tough adventure without any financial assistance from the state. The presentation of the Baksı Museum was held in Istanbul Modern in June 2010 and the opening was in July. In 2012, the Warehouse Museum, the new exhibition hall of the museum, met with art lovers.

Workshops
 Ehram and Rug Workshop
 Contemporary Art Workshop

Activities
 YGA Social Innovation Camp was held at the Baksı Museum 20 July 2017
 Yoga at Baksı Museum 8 June 2017
 Baksı Student Art Festival is 5 Years Old 11 May 2017

Areas
Exhibition halls, Warehouse Museum, workshops, conference hall, library and guest house, Baksı Museum is spreading in a land of 40 acres.

Awards
 Elle Style Awards 2015 
 Council of Europe Museum Prize, 2014
 KuduakaA 2014  
 Çagsav Corporate Honorary Award 2011  
 T.B.M.M. Honor Award 2011 
 Tuyap Art-Lover Institution Award, 2010 
 Contemporary Istanbul, 2010 
 Golden Compass, 2010

References

External links
official site

See also 
Bayburt 

Contemporary art galleries in Turkey
Arts in Turkey
Bayburt District
Art museums established in 2010
Museums in Bayburt Province
2010 establishments in Turkey